William Leveson Gower (c. 1696–1756) was a British Tory politician who sat in the House of Commons for 36 years from 1720 to 1756.

Leveson Gower was the second son of John Leveson Gower, 1st Baron Gower M.P. He married Anne Grosvenor, daughter of Sir Thomas Grosvenor, 3rd Baronet, MP of Eaton Hall, Cheshire on 26 May 1730.

Leveson Gower was returned unopposed as a Tory Member of Parliament for Staffordshire at a by-election on 29 December 1720, and was returned again at the next four general elections of 1722,  1727,  1734 and 1741. He consistently voted against the Government until in 1744, he went over to the Administration with his brother Lord Gower. He was re-elected in 1747 after a bitterly contested election. In 1751 he went into opposition with the Duke of Bedford, and severed his political connection with his brother. In December 1751, the Princess Emily wanted him to be made treasurer to the Prince of Wales and auditor to herself, but  Pelham insisted that he ask for Lord Gower's interest, which he refused to do.  He voted in January 1752 with the Administration on the Saxon subsidy treaty, which the Duke of Bedford had opposed in the House of Lords,  but subsequently reverted to opposition. He was returned at the  1754 and was classed as a member of the Bedford group, then in opposition.

In May 1756 Leveson Gower had ‘a stroke of palsy  in the House of Commons’. He died on 13 December 1756, leaving one daughter. He was also the brother of Thomas Leveson-Gower and Baptiste Leveson-Gower who were also MPs.

References

1690s births
1756 deaths
Younger sons of barons
Members of the Parliament of Great Britain for English constituencies
British MPs 1715–1722
British MPs 1722–1727
British MPs 1727–1734
British MPs 1734–1741
British MPs 1741–1747
British MPs 1747–1754
British MPs 1754–1761